Jasmine Chen (June 15, 1989 in Taipei) is a Taiwanese Olympic showjumper. Her coach is the German jumper and entrepreneur Paul Schockemöhle, who also trains her twin sister Joy, also a showjumper. In 2006 Jasmine Chen competed in the Asian Games in Doha, Qatar with her horse, an Oldenburg named Comodoro, placing 2nd in the singles and 7th place in the team competition. Jasmine attended the University of Pennsylvania where she majored in Art History. She has also worked at Sotheby’s Contemporary Art department in New York and Hong Kong between 2013 and 2020.

References
  Portrait auf riderstour.de
 FEI article on Asian Games

Living people
1989 births
Sportspeople from Taipei
Taiwanese female equestrians
Show jumping riders
Taiwanese emigrants to the United States
Equestrians at the 2006 Asian Games
Equestrians at the 2010 Asian Games
Equestrians at the 2018 Asian Games
Asian Games silver medalists for Chinese Taipei
Asian Games medalists in equestrian
Medalists at the 2006 Asian Games
University of Pennsylvania alumni
Equestrians at the 2020 Summer Olympics
Olympic equestrians of Taiwan